Ramón Antonio Fermín Ventura (born November 25, 1972 in San Francisco de Macorís, Dominican Republic) is a former professional baseball relief pitcher. He played in one game in Major League Baseball for the Oakland Athletics during the 1995 season. Listed at 6' 3", 180 lb., he batted and threw right-handed.

In 1.1 innings of work, Fermín gave up four hits, two runs and a walk for a 13.50 ERA. He did not have a decision.

Before the 1996 season Fermín was traded by Oakland along with Fausto Cruz to the Detroit Tigers in exchange for Phil Plantier, but he did not play for Detroit. He pitched in their farm system that year, and again in 1997, before being let go. He attempted a comeback in 2001 for the New Jersey Jackals of the independent Northern League, but pitched just 4 games before calling it quits.

External links

1972 births
Arizona League Athletics players
Dominican Republic expatriate baseball players in the United States
Huntsville Stars players
Jacksonville Suns players

Living people
Madison Muskies players
Major League Baseball pitchers
Major League Baseball players from the Dominican Republic
Modesto A's players
New Jersey Jackals players
Oakland Athletics players
Toledo Mud Hens players
Brother Elephants players
Dominican Republic expatriate baseball players in Taiwan